Carlos Macías may refer to:

Carlos Macias Arellano (born 1931), Mexican politician
Carlos Fuentes Macías (1928–2012), Mexican writer 
Carlos Jiménez Macías (born 1950), Mexican politician
Carlos Manuel Urzúa Macías (born 1955), Mexican economist
Carlos Tello Macías (born 1938), Mexican economist

See also 
Macías